The Mitsubishi A7M Reppū (烈風, "Strong Wind") was designed as the successor to the Imperial Japanese Navy's A6M Zero, with development beginning in 1942. Performance objectives were to achieve superior speed, climb, diving, and armament over the Zero, as well as better maneuverability. To meet these performance specifications its size and weight were significantly greater than its predecessor. The A7M's allied codename was "Sam".

Design and development
Towards the end of 1940, the Imperial Japanese Navy asked Mitsubishi to start design on a carrier-based fighter, to meet specification 16-Shi (a designation under a system using regnal years that indicated "1941" – the year in which the specification was formally issued). The fighter would be the successor to the carrier-based Zero. At that time, however, there were no viable high-output, compact engines to use for a new fighter. In addition, Jiro Horikoshi's team was preoccupied with addressing early production issues with the A6M2b as well as starting development on the A6M3 and the 14-Shi interceptor (which would later become the Mitsubishi J2M Raiden, a land-based interceptor built to counter high-altitude bombers). As a result, work on the Zero successor was halted in January 1941.

In April 1942, the development of the A6M3 and the 14-Shi interceptor was complete, and the Japanese Navy once again tasked Mitsubishi and Horikoshi's team with designing a new Zero successor to become the Navy Experimental 17-shi Ko (A) Type Carrier Fighter Reppu.

As before, one of the main hurdles was engine selection. To meet the specifications the engine would need to produce at least , which narrowed choices down to Nakajima's NK9 (Ha-45/Homare), or Mitsubishi's MK9 (Ha-43); both engines still being under development. These engines were based on 14-cylinder (Nakajima Sakae and Mitsubishi Kinsei, respectively) engines converted to 18-cylinder powerplants. The early NK9 had less output but was already approved by the Navy for use on the Yokosuka P1Y Ginga, while the larger MK9 promised more horsepower.

With the larger, more powerful engine, wing loading became an issue. The Navy requested at most 150 kg/m2, but wanted 130 kg/m2 which complicated design considerations further. With the NK9 it could achieve 150 kg/m2, but with the less power it would not meet the specifications for maximum speed. With the MK9 the engineers concluded it could fulfill the requirements; however, production of the MK9 was delayed compared to the NK9, and the Japanese Navy instructed Mitsubishi to use the NK9.

Work on the 17-Shi was further delayed by factories prioritizing A6M and Mitsubishi G4M production as well as further work on A6M variants and addressing Raiden issues. As a result, the 17-Shi, which became the A7M1, officially flew for the first time on 6 May 1944, four years after development started. The aircraft demonstrated excellent handling and maneuverability, but was underpowered as Mitsubishi engineers feared, and with a top speed similar to the A6M5 Zero. It was a disappointment, and the Navy ordered development to stop on 30 July 1944, but Mitsubishi obtained permission for development to continue using the Ha-43 engine, flying with the completed Ha-43 on 13 October 1944. The A7M2 was also equipped with automatic combat flaps, used earlier on the Kawanishi N1K-J, significantly improving maneuverability.

In June 1945, ace pilot Saburō Sakai was ordered to Nagoya to test the prototype. He was favorably impressed.

Variants
 A7M1 Reppū
First prototype powered by a  Nakajima Homare 22 engine, with a maximum speed of 574 km/h (356 mph). The armament consisted of two 13.2 mm (.52 in) Type 3 machine guns and two 20 mm (.80 in) Type 99 cannons in the wings. While featuring excellent manoeuvrability, the A7M1's Homare engine left it underpowered which resulted in its cancellation. Eight built.
 A7M2 Reppū
Revised version powered by a  Mitsubishi Ha-43 engine, with a maximum speed of 627 km/h (389 mph). Armament the same as previous model, or four 20 mm (.80 in) Type 99 cannons. The A7M2 was to be the main production aircraft of the A7M series. Three were converted from A7M1. One massproduction type under assembling at the end of the war. 
 A7M3 Reppū
Proposed land-based fighter version powered by a  mechanically driven three-speed supercharged Mitsubishi Ha-43 engine, with a maximum speed of 642 km/h (398 mph). The armament consisted of six 20 mm (.80 in) Type 99 cannons in the wings. Prototype under construction but was incomplete prior to end of war.
 A7M3-J Reppū-Kai
Proposed land-based interceptor version powered by a  turbo-supercharged Mitsubishi Ha-43 engine including an inter-cooler, with a maximum speed of 648 km/h (402 mph). The armament consisted of six 30 mm (1.20 in) Type 5 cannons, four wing-mounted & two oblique fuselage-mounted. Full-scale mock-up built, but no prototype.

Production

 Production was disrupted by an earthquake on 7 December 1944 in the Nagoya region, and Allied bombing raids on 11 March 1945, which caused the loss of full scale drawings and jigs for the A7M2 and Ki-83. This ceased the development of the A7M2 and the plane would never see combat.

Specifications (A7M2)

See also

Footnotes

Bibliography

 Angelucci, Enzo. The Rand McNally Encyclopedia of Military Aircraft, 1914–1980. San Diego, California: The Military Press, 1983. .
 
 Green, William. Warplanes of the Second World War, Volume Three: Fighters. London: Macdonald & Co. (Publishers) Ltd., 1961 (seventh impression 1973). .

External links 

Carrier-based aircraft
A7M, Mitsubishi
A7M
A7M, Mitsubishi
Single-engined tractor aircraft
Aircraft first flown in 1944